John Percival Maxwell Heron (25 December 1892 – 5 August 1950) was an Australian rules football player at the Fitzroy Football Club in the Victorian Football League (VFL). He became a premiership player at Fitroy, playing in the 1913 VFL Grand Final, under the captaincy of Bill Walker, with Percy Parratt as coach. Heron made his debut against  in Round 3 of the 1912 VFL season, at the Brunswick Street Oval.

References

External links
 
 

1892 births
Fitzroy Football Club players
Fitzroy Football Club Premiership players
1950 deaths
Australian rules footballers from Melbourne
One-time VFL/AFL Premiership players
People from Clifton Hill, Victoria